Brier is a surname. Notable people with the surname include:

 Bob Brier (born 1943), American Egyptologist
 Hannah Brier (born 1998), British sprinter
 Joe Brier (born 1999), British sprinter and brother of Hannah
 Kathy Brier (born 1975), American actor and singer
 Markus Brier (born 1968), Austrian golfer
 Paul Brier (born 1959), American general

See also
 Briers, a surname